Shengqiao may refer to the following locations in China:

 Shengqiao, Lujiang County (盛桥镇), town in Anhui
 Shengqiao, Changning (胜桥镇), a town of Changning City, Hunan.